Lynsay Ryan (born in 1984) is a Canadian singer, multi-instrumentalist and songwriter from Kelowna, British Columbia, Canada.  A graduate of McMaster University and University of Toronto.  

She is the daughter of two-time world champion curling skip Pat Ryan.  In 2005, Ryan posed in a see-through sarong in a calendar to promote women's curling.

See also
 Ana Arce
 Daniela Jentsch
 Melanie Robillard
 Kasia Selwand
 Claudia Toth

References

External links
 Ana Acre Team Sponsorship Calendar 2006
 The Curling News
 Curling calendar creating stir 
 Calendar to provide funds for players in European nations
 Women of curling gain greater exposure

1984 births
Canadian women curlers
Curlers from British Columbia
Living people
Sportspeople from Kelowna